Structural abuse is the process by which an individual or group is dealt with unfairly by a social or cultural system or authority. This unfairness manifests itself as abuse in a psychological, financial, physical or spiritual form, and victims often are unable to protect themselves from harm. An individual's inability to protect themselves may lead to their entrapment in the system, preventing them from seeking justice or recompense for crimes endured and damages incurred, creating a feeling of isolation or helplessness. 
Systems containing abusive structures are primarily designed to control individuals or manipulate them for material gain.  Most social systems contain at least one structure that induces structural abuse. These structures, when allowed to exist, create a cycle of abuse, wherein the abuse is repetitive or contagious in nature, and may become acceptable in other parts of the system.

Structural abuse differs to structural violence in terms of scale – structural violence is a process occurring within an entire society, such as racism or classism, while structural abuse refers to a specific element of society, or a specific system within society. Abuse occurring on this smaller scale is not necessarily endorsed by wider society, such as modern witch hunts, which have been condemned in South Africa, regardless of deaths that still occur in areas retaining anti-Pagan social structures. Structural abuse can be found on a very small scale, such as in instances of bullying involving more than one perpetrator, or in cases of malfeasance, a common example of which is individual police officers  conducting investigations without direct evidence, or ignoring formal complaints made by victims.

Process

Types
There are three types of structural abuse:
 Structural interference with an individual's personal health; psychological, social, emotional, physical or spiritual.
 Structural interference with an individual's relationships; compromising the ability to establish and maintain social relationships – intimate or platonic.
 Structural interference with an individual's liberties and rights; compromising the ability to establish and maintain employment, practicing hobbies or executing other liberties and legal rights.

Affected Groups
Structural abuse is often indirect. As such it can affect vulnerable groups, such as: 

 Children 
 Young adults 
 Adults with disabilities 
 The elderly

Nature
Structural abuses often "survive" on heuristics of fallacies and distortions of logic.

See also 
Discrimination
Judicial murder
Kangaroo court
Witch-hunts 
Bullying

References

Further reading
 Antisocial Supply -- An educational resource to help others identify emotional and psychological abuse -- antiss.net

Psychological abuse
Abuse